Fadel Karbon (born 10 December 1992) is a Norwegian footballer who plays as a forward.

Career statistics

Club

Notes

References

External links

1992 births
Living people
Norwegian footballers
Norwegian expatriate footballers
Norwegian expatriate sportspeople in Japan
Expatriate footballers in Japan
Association football midfielders
Skeid Fotball players
Lyn Fotball players
FC Ryukyu players
J3 League players
Sportspeople from Tønsberg